His Majesty and Company or His Majesty and Co is a 1935 British musical film directed by Anthony Kimmins and starring John Garrick, Barbara Waring, and Morton Selten. It was made at Wembley Studios by the British subsidiary of the Fox Film Company as a quota quickie.

Cast

References

Bibliography
 Low, Rachael. Filmmaking in 1930s Britain. George Allen & Unwin, 1985.
 Wood, Linda. British Films, 1927-1939. British Film Institute, 1986.

External links

1935 films
British musical films
1935 musical films
Films shot at Wembley Studios
Films directed by Anthony Kimmins
British black-and-white films
1930s English-language films
1930s British films
Quota quickies